The Amberley Museum Railway is a  narrow gauge railway based at Amberley Museum, Amberley, West Sussex. It has a varied collection of engines and rolling stock ranging from  gauge to  gauge. It operates passenger trains at the museum using a mixture of steam, internal combustion and battery-electric locomotives.

History

Pre-Preservation

Before the advent of Amberley Museum, the site was a chalk quarry operated by Pepper & Sons.  The site had its own loco worked  railway, which connected with the London, Brighton & South Coast Railway at Amberley station.  Over the years Peppers owned a range of locos, including Marshall and Aveling & Porter steam designs, and a Hibberd Planet petrol loco.  When the site was abandoned in the late 1960s the track was lifted.

Early Days

When the museum opened in the late 1970s a small industrial railway was envisaged, operating typical narrow gauge industrial trains.  The first loco to arrive on site was Hibberd Simplex 1980 from the City of Chichester Sewage Works at Apuldram.  In 1982 the Thakeham Tiles company, located a few miles from the museum, donated its entire railway system including two Hudson Hunslet locos, several wagons and some track, a new conveyor system having started operation at the works.  The donation was on the condition the whole lot was removed over a weekend.  This was duly accomplished.  Today some of the Thakeham track is still in use on non-passenger parts of the line, along with one of the locos (Hunslet 3653).  The other, Hudson Hunslet 2208 is in store, having been used as a spares donor for the museum's other Hudson Hunslet locos.  Also in 1982, the Brockham Railway Museum in Surrey closed down and moved its entire stock to Amberley.  This influx, including several steam locos, gave the inspiration to expand the operation to a passenger carrying line.

The Combined Collection

A running line was built at Amberley from 1982 to 1984 running along one side of the pit between Amberley and Brockham stations.  The inaugural train was hauled by Polar Bear, by that time back in steam.  The Hudson Hunslet diesels 3097 and Blue Star were stalwarts of the passenger service in the 80s, until the arrival of Motor Rail Simplex 60S prototype 11001.  In the mid-1980s Decauville 0-4-0WT 'Barbouilleur' entered service, and following Polar Bear's boiler being condemned around 1987, was the sole steam locomotive available until 1993.  'Polar Bear' re-entered traffic with a new boiler in 1993, and was joined that same year by 'Peter'.  'Townsend Hook' departed in 1995 to Eastleigh College for an ultimately ill-fated restoration attempt.

Expansion

The railway expanded in the 2000s. In the early 2000s it was decided that WW1 Baldwin  778 Lion, which had been in store for many years, needed an alternative home for it to be restored, as it was far too big for the sharp curves on the Amberley system. It departed for the Leighton Buzzard railway, where it is now in service. A new exhibition hall for the Amberley railway, built with lottery funding, was opened in 2003. This building also serves as a carriage shed; the carriage fleet had previously suffered severe deterioration when stored outside. A new running shed was also built, opening in 2005. It serves as a dedicated operating and restoration base for the passenger steam fleet, as well as a dedicated home and charging station for the battery electric locos. The steam fleet was bolstered in 2006 by the arrival of the Hampshire Narrow Gauge Trust's Bagnall  2091 Wendy. The running line was extended in the 2000s, with the extension round the top of the pit to the new Cragside station opening in mid-2007. In 2008 Hunslet diesel-hydraulic 8969 No. 12 entered service as the main non-steam passenger loco. The steam fleet grew again in 2009 when HNGRT's other steam loco, Quarry Hunslet  542 Cloister arrived. However both HNGRT locos left Amberley during summer 2012.

The line today

The main line runs from Amberley station near the museum entrance along the side of the pit past the De Witt lime kilns to Brockham station, currently the only intermediate station.  From Brockham the line curves round the top of the pit, passes the running shed and ends up at Cragside station, across the pit from Brockham. The industrial (non-passenger) lines connect to the main line at Brockham station. At Amberley station there is a rarely used siding into the woodyard. Brockham has a small siding on Platform 2, as well as a former London, Brighton and South Coast Railway ticket office from Hove station. In addition there is the Betchworth Hall shed, used for the restoration of Townsend Hook; it will eventually be used as a museum to display the Dorking Greystone Lime Co. exhibits (Townsend Hook, Monty, The Major, wagons 10 and 60, and some miscellaneous items).

The railway holds its annual Gala Weekend on the second weekend of July each year, in addition to two Industrial Trains Days in April and October.

Locomotives
Listings correct as of December 2017

Engines marked 'In occasional use' are generally only operated at railway special events and are usually either on display in the museum building or stored in one of the sheds or the tunnel.  Locos marked 'Air Fitted/Piped' are capable of hauling passenger trains.

Steam locomotives

Internal combustion locomotives

Battery-electric locomotives

Passenger Stock

 1x RAF Fauld coach. Restored in 2007.  Can run on its own or with the Lydd or Penrhyn coaches.
 2x Lydd coaches.  From Lydd Ranges in Kent.  Can run together as a set or with the Fauld coach to make a 3-car set.
 2x Penrhyn Quarry Railway coaches.  Open top coaches, have to run with either the Fauld coach or one Lydd coach due to lack of a brake position or air brake reserve tanks.
 4x Groudle Glen Railway coaches.  Usually run with Polar Bear, but can run with certain other diesel and steam locos.
 Wickham trolley 3404.  Originally trailer car for powered trolley 3403, now converted to push-pull trailer to run with battery loco 4998.
 1x Thorpe Park coach. Built by Alan Keef. Body frame only, new bogies are to be ordered for this coach.

Gallery

In popular culture
The railway made an appearance in the 1985 James Bond film, A View to a Kill, with the railway's storage tunnel appearing as the entrance to a mine.  Later, engines HE3097 and 'Blue Star' were sent to Pinewood Studios along with a quantity of wagons to film scenes 'inside the mine'.  Many of the railway's skip wagons still carry 'Zorin' green livery.

In 2010 four of the museum's Hudson flat wagons were sent to Pinewood Studios for use in the film, Captain America: The First Avenger.

References

External links

 Amberley Railway website
 Amberley Museum official website

Heritage railways in West Sussex
Museums in West Sussex
2 ft gauge railways in England
Narrow-gauge railway museums in the United Kingdom